Despatch Box was a late night political analysis television programme produced by the BBC and broadcast on BBC Two between 20 October 1998 and 20 December 2002. The programme was a replacement for the nightly political programme The Midnight Hour, and like its predecessor, was initially presented by a team of single-presenter journalists, rotated nightly, consisting of Zeinab Badawi, Michael Dobbs, Andrew Neil and Steve Richards. The programme regularly gained an audience of more than 350,000 viewers. Following a change of format, it was decided that the programme should have one, regular presenter, a role for which Andrew Neil was chosen. The programme was produced at the BBC's Millbank studios in London.

Following changes to sitting hours in the United Kingdom parliament, and extensive changes to the BBC's line-up of political programmes, Despatch Box was discontinued, and the programme's then regular presenter, Andrew Neil, moved on to present the Daily Politics and This Week.

See also

Westminster Live

References

BBC television news shows
1998 British television series debuts
2002 British television series endings
1990s British political television series
2000s British political television series
English-language television shows